Visitors is a play by the English playwright Barney Norris. The play premiered at the Arcola Theatre in London in March 2014, in a production directed by Alice Hamilton. It was produced by Norris and Hamilton's company Up In Arms. The cast included Linda Bassett, Robin Soans, Eleanor Wyld and Simon Muller.

The play revolves around an elderly couple who live on a farm on Salisbury Plain, and explores their relationships with each other, their son, and a young carer. The play received widespread acclaim from theatre critics at the Arcola, on a national tour and following its transfer to the Bush Theatre in winter 2014, and was selected by Henry Hitchings for the Evening Standard and Mark Lawson for the Guardian as one of the best productions of 2014.

The play won the Critics' Circle Award and the OffWestEnd Award for Most Promising Playwright for Norris, and the OffWestEnd Award and BritishTheatre.com Award for Best Actress for Linda Bassett. Norris was also nominated for the Writers' Guild of Great Britain Best New Play Award, and the Evening Standard Theatre Awards Charles Wintour Award for Most Promising Playwright, and the production received nominations for Best Actor for Robin Soans, Best Director for Alice Hamilton and Best New Play from the Offies Awards.

References

English plays
2014 plays